Autissier is a French surname. Notable people with the surname include:

 Isabelle Autissier (born 1956), French sailor, navigator, writer, and broadcaster
 Louis-Marie Autissier (1772–1830), French-born Belgian portrait miniature painter

French-language surnames